Jacqueline Simoneau (born September 29, 1996) is a Canadian synchronized swimmer.

Career 
In 2011, Simoneau won a gold medal in the Solo and Duet events, and a silver medal in the Figure event at the 2011 UANA Pan American Championships. In 2012, she qualified for her first National Team where she won a bronze medal in the Team event at the Comen Cup. In the same year, she won a bronze medal in the Solo event at the 2012 FINA World Junior Championships. In 2013, she won a bronze medal in both Technical and Free team at the Brazil Open. She finished 5th at the 2013 FINA World Aquatics Championships in the Technical team and Combo events, and 6th at the Free Team event. Simoneau won a silver medal in the Solo event at the 2014 FINA World Junior Synchronized Swimming Championships, getting gold in the Technical Routine and silver in the Free routine. She finished in 6th place in the Technical Solo event at the 2015 World Aquatics Championships.

She has been ranked consistently among the world's best five solo and duet synchronized swimmers between 2013 and 2015.

See Simoneau's success in Artistic swimming at the 2019 Pan American Games.

Simoneau, along with the Canadian Senior National Artistic Swimming Team, trains 10 hours a day, 6 days a week.

Olympian Timeline 
Simoneau won two gold medals at the 2015 Pan American Games and qualified for the 2016 Olympic Games. On May 18, 2016, Simoneau was named to Canada's 2016 Olympics team in the duet event. In Rio, Simoneau and her teammate Karine Thomas finished seventh. In July 2019, Canada's Olympic team - led by Simoneau - competed in Gwangju, Korea, where their team finished 7th in both Free and Technical team, and 4th in the Highlight routine; Simoneau and Claudia Holzner's Technical duet placed 7th and their Free 6th; Simoneau's Technical and Free solos placed 5th. These results led to the qualification of Simoneau and Holzner's Women's Technical Duet, and the Canadian Women's Free and Technical Teams to the Tokyo 2020 Olympics.

Education 
Simoneau attends Vanier College: Saint Laurent in Quebec, Canada, studying Health Science.

Leadership and activism 
Simoneau is a RBC Olympian. She mentors student athletes in Quebec. She is an ambassador for the Make-A-Wish Foundation, for AthletesCAN and the Foundation of Stars (a non-profit organization which does pediatric research) and Fast and Female, an organization which aims to increase confidence and leadership in girls through sport participation.

Media 
She stars in the CBC Documentary Perfect, which gives an inside scoop to the hardships of the Canadian Artistic Swimming Team in their attempt to qualify for the 2016 Summer Olympic games.

Interests 
Simoneau has been a part of Vanier College: Saint Laurent's Robotics Club since 2016, which competes at the Canadian Robotics Competition annually.

References

External links 
 

1996 births
Living people
Canadian synchronized swimmers
Pan American Games gold medalists for Canada
Swimmers from Montreal
Synchronized swimmers at the 2015 Pan American Games
Artistic swimmers at the 2019 Pan American Games
Synchronized swimmers at the 2015 World Aquatics Championships
Synchronized swimmers at the 2016 Summer Olympics
Synchronized swimmers at the 2020 Summer Olympics
Synchronized swimmers at the 2017 World Aquatics Championships
Olympic synchronized swimmers of Canada
Pan American Games medalists in synchronized swimming
Artistic swimmers at the 2019 World Aquatics Championships
Medalists at the 2015 Pan American Games
Medalists at the 2019 Pan American Games
20th-century Canadian women
21st-century Canadian women